The 1968 French Grand Prix was a Formula One motor race held at the Rouen-Les-Essarts Circuit on 7 July 1968. It was race 6 of 12 in both the 1968 World Championship of Drivers and the 1968 International Cup for Formula One Manufacturers. The 60-lap race was won by Ferrari driver Jacky Ickx after he started from third position. John Surtees finished second for the Honda team and Matra driver Jackie Stewart came in third.

The French driver Jo Schlesser had a fatal accident on the second lap of the race, when he lost control in the then-new Honda RA302 chassis which overturned and caught fire partially due to its magnesium content. He was chosen as driver when regular Honda F1 driver John Surtees refused to drive the new car, opting for the older RA301 chassis, on the grounds that the new car was unsafe. This race was a turning point in Formula One as the death of Schlesser prompted many safety precautions in later races. 

This was also the last F1 race to take place at Rouen-Les Essarts.

Classification

Qualifying

Race

Championship standings after the race 

Drivers' Championship standings

Constructors' Championship standings

Note: Only the top five positions are included for both sets of standings.

References

Further reading

French Grand Prix
French Grand Prix
1968 in French motorsport